The Mennaye Field is a sports stadium located in Penzance, Cornwall, UK. The ground was provided by the Borough of Penzance for the Penzance and Newlyn RFC formed on Tuesday, 12 December 1944 with the amalgamation of Penzance RFC and Newlyn RFC. The current tenants are the Cornish Pirates rugby union team, who play in the RFU Championship. The club moved, in 2005, to a temporary stadium at Kenwyn, near Truro and the following year to Camborne Recreation Ground. In 2010 the club returned to the Mennaye Field and announced that the capacity would be increased from its original capacity of 3,500 to the current capacity of 4,000 with 2,200 seats.

History
The first mention of playing rugby in the Mennaye Fields was in January 1934 when a sub-committee was set up to negotiate with the Borough of Penzance for a tenancy of the fields; finally granted in 1945. The ground was equi-distant between St Goulder (Newlyn's ground) and St Clare (Penzance's ground).

General Dwight D Eisenhower, the Supreme Commander of the Allied Forces in Europe inspected American troops on 26 June 1944 at the Mennaye. Soldiers of the 1st Battalion of the 35th Division had been billeted with families in Penzance. The troops marched along the promenade to the Mennaye where Eisenhower, along with General George S Patton took a salute on the bank. The 1st Battalion, was part of the back-up to the initial D-Day landings on 6 June 1944, leaving Penzance on 4 July and reaching Normandy the next day.

List of tenants
 1945 – 2005, Penzance-Newlyn RFC/Cornish Pirates
 1945 – 1973, Mounts Bay RFC (under-18)
 1974 – present, Pirates Colts
 1999 – 2009, Mounts Bay RFC
 2010 – present, Penzance-Newlyn Amateurs
 2010 – present, Cornish Pirates

First match
 22 September 1945: Penzance–Newlyn v Guy's Hospital 3 – 15 (att 3,000).

References

Rugby union stadiums in England
Rugby union in Cornwall
Sports venues in Cornwall
Sports venues completed in 1945
Sport in Penzance
Cornish Pirates
Buildings and structures in Penzance